Mamasapano: Now It Can Be Told is a 2022 Philippine historical action film directed by Lester Dimaranan starring Edu Manzano, Aljur Abrenica, and Paolo Gumabao.

Cast
Edu Manzano as Gen. Benjamin Magalong
Aljur Abrenica as Lt. Franco
Paolo Gumabao as Supt. Raymond Train
Alan Paule as Gen. Getulio Napenas
Rey Abellana as Col. Pabalinas
Gerald Santos as Sgt. Lalan
Rez Cortez as Gen. Alan Purisima
Juan Rodrigo as Secretary Mar Roxas
Jervic Cajarop as President Noynoy Aquino
Claudine Barretto as Erica Pabalinas

Also making appearances in the film are Jojo Abellana, Ronnie Liang, Kuya Manzano, Jim Pebanco, Tom Olivar, Rico Barrera, LA Santos, Marcus Madrigal, AJ Oteyza, Marco Gomez, Rash Flores, Elmo Elarmo, and Nathan Cajucom. Ritz Azul and Myrtle Sarrosa makes a guest appearance in the film, portraying composite characters.

Production
Mamasapano: Now It Can Be Told was made by Borracho Film Production under producer-lawyer Ferdinand Topacio. The film is based on the Mamasapano clash in 2015 which led to the death of 44 members of the Philippine National Police's (PNP) Special Action Force. The film was submitted as a script for the 2020 Metro Manila Film Festival but was not accepted. The film was directed by Lester Dimaranan and written by Eric Ramos. Ramos remarked that the script he did for Mamasapano was the hardest, since he "can't invent" and had to do research for the film. Only the characters of Ritz Azul and Myrtle Sarrosa are fictional who portrayed reporters from two rival networks. Mamasapano is described as action, a war film, and a procedural.

The film is based on the board of inquiry report of the PNP and the investigation report on the incident by the Senate.

The film was already in production in 2020 with Law Fajardo as director. Production was not finished on schedule and was supposedly should have been finished by May of that year. It was planned that the scene of the Mamasapano clash be shot during the dry season, but rainy season came without the certain scene shot. This led to the replacement of most of the production staff with writer Ramos being a noted holdover of the Fajardo team. Work for Mamasapano continued in January 2022. Farjardo was replaced by Dimaranan.

Mamasapano had a private test screening on August 26, 2022 at the Baguio Country Club in Baguio. It was not yet picture locked and is already 99 percent complete at that time. It was screened in order for the production team to determine what kind of tweaking the film still needed.

Release
Mamasapano was released on cinemas in the Philippines on December 25, 2022 as one of the eight official entries of the 2022 Metro Manila Film Festival. Had the film not been accepted as an entry for the 2022 Metro Manila Film Festival, it was planned for the film to premiere on November 30, 2022.

Notes

References

2022 films
Filipino-language films
2020s police procedural films
War films based on actual events
2020s action war films